The 2001–02 FIS Cross-Country World Cup was the 21st official World Cup season in cross-country skiing for men and women. The season began in Kuopio, Finland on 24 November 2001 and finished in Lillehammer, Norway on 23 March 2002. Per Elofsson of Sweden won the overall men's cup, and Bente Skari of Norway won the women's.

Calendar

Men

Women

Men's team

Women's team

Men's standings

Overall

Sprint

Women's standings

Overall

Sprint

Achievements
Victories in this World Cup (all-time number of victories as of 2001–02 season in parentheses)

Men
 , 4 (11) first places
 , 3 (13) first places
 , 3 (3) first places
 , 3 (3) first places
 , 2 (4) first places
 , 1 (7) first place
 , 1 (3) first place
 , 1 (2) first place
 , 1 (1) first place
 , 1 (1) first place

Women
 , 7 (28) first places
 , 3 (7) first places
 , 2 (23) first places
 , 2 (13) first places
 , 2 (7) first places
 , 2 (3) first place
 , 1 (4) first place
 , 1 (1) first place

References

External links

FIS Cross-Country World Cup seasons
World Cup 2001-02
World Cup 2001-02